The Seyhan Dam  is a hydroelectric dam on the Seyhan River north of Adana, Turkey

The dam was constructed in the 1950s as the first in a series of hydroelectric projects funded by the World Bank. The project was authorized by Prime Minister Adnan Menderes. The project manager was Süleyman Demirel, who later became prime minister and the ninth president of Turkey.

The ancient city of Augusta, was flooded by the Seyhan Dam Lake in 1955.

See also

Çatalan Dam – upstream

External links
Reservoir Photos

References 

Dams in Adana Province
Hydroelectric power stations in Turkey
Dams completed in 1956
Dams on the Seyhan River
Rowing venues
2013 Mediterranean Games venues